This is a list of towns, cities, and villages in the province of Utrecht in the Netherlands.

See also 
 List of municipalities in Utrecht

References 
 GEOnet Names Server (GNS)
 ANWB Topografische Atlas Nederland, 2005
 VUGA's Alfabetische Plaatsnamengids van Nederland, 1997.

Unless another source is given, the settlement is shown in the topographical atlas.

 
Utrecht